The Muselli collection was one of the most notable art collections in 18th century Italy and - with the Gusti and Curtoni collections - a highlight of modern collecting in Verona.

History 
Giacomo Muselli (1569-1641) came from a family of merchants and enjoyed an exceptionally secure economic status. He lived in the Bra district of Verona and appeared in the 1614 census aged 45. In the 1616 assessment he was rated in the top tax bracket. It is unclear when he began collecting, but in only a few decades he gathered around 150 high quality small and medium sized works. He remained attached to his collection, refusing to sell it to Francesco I d'Este and adding a provision in his will banning his children from lending works or having copies made of them. 

The collection included several works by Renaissance artists from Venice or of Venetian descent such as Veronese, Titian, Giovanni Bellini and Moretto da Brescia, along with works by 16th century German, Flemish and Dutch artists such as Civetta and Lucas Cranach the Elder) and the 17th century Veronese school. Alessandro Turchi works on canvas and touchstone were particularly strongly represented. It also included a small but important collection of drawings and prints, along with a bas-relief of The Judgement of Solomon by Giammaria Mosca (Louvre). The drawings included Man with a Pregnant Bitch by Parmigianino (a possible self-portrait) and  Fall of Phaeton by Michelangelo (British Museum), acquired in Verona from the French banker and collector Pierre Crozat and on his death passing to the major drawings expert Pierre-Jean Mariette. 

The collection as a whole became an unmissable attraction for noblemen and artists who mentioned it in travel diaries and other works such as “Maraviglie dell'arte” (1648) by Carlo Ridolfi and “Microcosmo della pittura” (1657) by Francesco Scannelli. Giacomo senior's two sons Cristoforo and Giovan Francesco kept the collection together in Verona in the face of much interest from potential Italian and foreign buyers such as Alfonso IV d'Este and his uncle Cesare d'Este (Francesco I's younger brother), perhaps more for its growing economic value than for family reasons or artistic appreciation. 

Of Cristoforo's three sons Girolamo, Giacomo and Paolo, it would be Giacomo and Paolo who finally sold the collection in 1685-1687 to Jean-Baptiste Colbert marquess of Seignelay (1651-1690), eldest son of Louis XIV's controller of finances Jean-Baptiste Colbert, with the French merchant Louis Alvarez and the painter Jean-Baptiste Forest acting as middlemen. On arrival in Paris the collection was split up into small lots and re-sold to Parisian collections such as that of Pierre Crozat, before soon moving onto Russian, German, Dutch and British collections. 17th-century Paris was an important market for the European art market in general and the dispersal of Veronese collections in particular.

Selected works with current locations

 Titian, Noli me tangere, National Gallery, London
 Studio of Giovanni Bellini, Circumcision of Christ, National Gallery, London
 Giovanni Bellini, Madonna and Child with Saints Peter and Mark (?) and a donor, Birmingham Museums and Art Gallery
 Moretto da Brescia, Allegory of Faith, Hermitage Museum, Saint Petersburg
 Domenico Capriolo, Man in a Fur, Hermitage Museum, Saint Petersburg
 Domenico Fetti:
Assumption, Hermitage Museum, Saint Petersburg
The Healing of Tobit, Hermitage Museum, Saint Petersburg
 Paris Bordone:
Holy Family with Saint Catherine, Hermitage Museum, Saint Petersburg
Portrait of Gian Giacomo Caraglio, Wawel Castle, Krakov
 Alessandro Turchi:
 Andromeda, Alte Meister, Kassel
Leda with Cupids, Alte Meister, Kassel
Madonna and Child with the Infant Saint John the Baptist, University of Kentucky Art Museum, Lexington
 Hans Rottenhammer and Jan Brueghel the Elder, Rest on the Flight into Egypt, Alte Pinakothek, Munich
 Hans Rottenhammer, The Wedding Feast at Cana, Alte Pinakothek, Munich
 Paolo Veronese, Portrait of a Man, Hermitage Museum, Saint Petersburg
 Paolo Veronese
Holy Family with the Infant Saint John the Baptist, Rijksmuseum, Amsterdam
Baptism of Christ, The J. Paul Getty Museum, Los Angeles
Rest on the Flight into Egypt, private collection
Supper at Emmaus, Museum Boijmans Van Beuningen, Rotterdam
Venus at a Mirror, Joslyn Art Museum, Omaha
Rebecca at the Well, Burghley House, Stamford
 Michelangelo Anselmi, Christ and the Samaritan Woman, Burghley House, Stamford

Bibliography  
  L. De Fuccia, Pour "la satisfaction tant attendue" et "les désirs passionnés" du marquis de Seignelay: une correspondance inédite sur le voyage d'Alvarez en Italie, in Revue de l'art, 152, 2006, pp. 37–52.
  D. Dossi, La collezione di Agostino e Gian Giacomo Giusti, in Verona Illustrata, 21, 2008, pp. 109–126.
  D. Dossi, I quadri già Muselli all'Ermitage: precisazioni su alcune provenienze, in Verona Illustrata, 26, 2013, pp. 49–66.
  D. Dossi, Alessandro Turchi nella Francia del Seicento: opere, mercato, commissioni, in ArtItalies, 19, 2013, pp. 10–21.
  D. Dossi, La Galleria Curtoni di Verona: la sua dispersione e qualche recupero, in Arte Veneta, 69, 2014, pp. 169–176.
  D. Dossi, La scultura moderna nelle collezioni veronesi fra Cinque e Seicento, in Arte Cristiana, 102, 2014, 883, pp. 311–316.
  D. Dossi, La collezione Muselli di Verona. La quadreria negli anni ottanta del Seicento, in Studi di Storia dell'Arte, 25, 2015, pp. 187–198.
  D. Dossi, Collezionare disegni a Verona nel Seicento: il caso Muselli, in Verona Illustrata, 28, 2015, pp. 115–132.

History of Verona
Private art collections